St Olaf's Church, Unst is a ruined medieval church located on the island of Unst, in Shetland, Scotland, UK. The church was built in the Celtic style, and dates to the twelfth century. The burial ground surrounding the church includes several early medieval stone crosses. Historic Environment Scotland first listed the site as a scheduled monument in 1957.

Description

Approximately  of the eastern section of the building has been rebuilt. The fabric of the building is made of local rubble in lime mortar, and is in poor condition. It has been determined that church was built in the twelfth century and was in use until 1785.

A covered-up rectangular doorway at the west end of the south wall of the church can still be seen. The current entrance, an arched doorway, is located in the west gable. The church was built in the Celtic style, with its characteristic inclined jambs.  The interior of the church contains memorials to the Mouat family and a 1573 stone slab marking the grave of Segebad Detkin. A decorative carving of either a fish or serpent on a lintel over one of the windows was created before the stone's current use in the church. The graveyard surrounding the church has expanded over the years and is still in use. It includes eight small stone crosses dating from the ninth to the twelfth centuries. Historic Environment Scotland first listed the site as a scheduled monument in 1957.

See also
Eynhallow Church
St Magnus Church, Egilsay
St Oran's Chapel

References

12th-century church buildings in Scotland
Church ruins in Scotland
Scheduled Ancient Monuments in Shetland